Primitive man may refer to:
Archaic humans
the caveman stock character
the noble savage stock character
Primitive culture
as proper name:
Primitive Man (album), a 1982 album by Icehouse
Primitive Man (band), an American sludge metal band
They also refer to First people

See also
The Mind of Primitive Man, a 1911 anthropology work by Franz Boas
A Primitive Man's Career to Civilization, a 1912 UK film directed and written by Cherry Kearton
Primitive Man (journal), a peer-reviewed journal of anthropology
Primitive (disambiguation)
Prehistoric man (disambiguation)
Human evolution
Homo
Primitivism